Hadley railway station was a railway station serving the village of Hadley in Shropshire, England. The station served both the former Stafford to Shrewsbury Line and was the start of the branch to Coalport. The station was opened in 1849 and closed in 1964.

The line through Hadley was closed from 1964, with the last remaining stretches of track being taken up in 1991. In the late 2000s a stretch of track was relaid to the Telford International Railfreight Park for freight purposes only.

The current closest station is Wellington, or a little further afield are both Oakengates or Telford.

References

Further reading

Disused railway stations in Shropshire
Railway stations in Great Britain opened in 1849
Railway stations in Great Britain closed in 1964
Former London and North Western Railway stations
Beeching closures in England